Mads Berg Sande (born 22 March 1998) is a Norwegian football midfielder who plays for Haugesund.

References

1998 births
Living people
Footballers from Bergen
Norwegian footballers
FK Fyllingsdalen players
Fana IL players
Nest-Sotra Fotball players
FK Haugesund players
Sandnes Ulf players
Norwegian Third Division players
Norwegian Second Division players
Norwegian First Division players
Eliteserien players
Association football midfielders
Norway youth international footballers